The Ford Resource and Engagement Center Bangkok, also known as FREC Bangkok, is a hub for Thailand-based NGOs in partnership with the Ford Motor Company Fund.

History 
Established in 2019, FREC Bangkok is located at the Satri Julanak school on Nakhon Sawan Road, in Bangkok's historic Nang Loeng neighborhood. The center builds upon the model established by the first FREC in Detroit, Michigan.

FREC Bangkok Partners 

 Scholars of Sustenance (SOS)
 Urban Studies Lab (USL)
 Nature Inc.
 Precious Plastics
 FabCafe Bangkok
 Bangkok 1899
 Creative Migration (East)
 Na Café

References 

Organizations based in Bangkok